The 1836 United States presidential election in North Carolina took place between November 3 and December 7, 1836, as part of the 1836 United States presidential election. Voters chose 15 representatives, or electors to the Electoral College, who voted for President and Vice President.

North Carolina voted for the Democratic candidate, Martin Van Buren, over Whig candidate Hugh White. Van Buren won North Carolina by a margin of 6.2%.

Results

References

North Carolina
1836
1836 North Carolina elections